Andy Classen is a German record producer, sound engineer and musician.

Holy Moses 

He began his career in 1980 as a guitarist for the German thrash metal band Holy Moses, fronted by his ex-wife Sabina Classen. In 1989 the band bought a house in the village of Borgentreich-Bühne in the vicinity of Warburg, North Rhine-Westphalia. In 1990 they founded a record label named 'West Virginia Records' and opened the Stage-One-Studio in their new house (so named because "Bühne" is German for "stage").

He remained lead guitarist in Holy Moses till 1994. Creative differences that had arisen during the production of the Holy Moses album No Matter What's the Cause (1994) with bassist Dan Lilker and Ryker's drummer Meff lead to Andy Classen leaving the band. Ultimately he and Sabina divorced, and West Virginia Records was dissolved.

Holy Moses was inactive till 2001 when it was revived by Sabina Classen, with Andy Classen acting as occasional songwriter and producer. In 2005 Holy Moses recorded the album Strength Power Will Passion the first without Andy Classen's involvement.

Producer 

Andy Classen became producer and engineer in Stage-One-Studio in 1990. Among his first productions were the albums When War Begins... by the German thrashcore band Warpath and Mc Gillroy the Housefly by the German psychedelic death metal band Incubator, both of which were critically acclaimed, with the latter still having a cult following in the death metal underground. He also became influential in the German hardcore punk scene, being the producer for bands like Ryker's and Brightside.

In 1994 he took over the studio completely and produced for other labels like Nuclear Blast, Century Media Records, Gun Records, Metal Blade Records, AFM Records, Massacre Records, Season of Mist, Armageddon Music etc.

During the nineties Andy Classen established himself as one of the premier producers for hardcore, thrash metal and death metal music in Europe. His sound aesthetics usually are described as aggressive and powerful, yet transparent. Among others he produced records for the bands Dew-Scented, Tankard, Disbelief, President Evil (all from Germany), Asphyx (Netherlands), Legen Beltza (Basque Country), The Old Dead Tree (France), Graveworm (Italy) and Deafness by Noise (Croatia).

From the year 2000, he has found increasing recognition for his work in the international scene, with bands like Rotting Christ from Greece, Criminal from Chile/Great Britain, Dark Embrace from Spain, Krisiun from Brazil as well as Mantic Ritual and Solace of Requiem from the USA recording with him.

Richthofen and Seelenwalzer 

In 1997 Andy Classen was founding member, songwriter, producer and guitarist with the German Neue Deutsche Härte industrial metal band Richthofen. After objections by the Richthofen family the band was legally required to drop the name and Richthofen disbanded in 1999.

In 2019 Classen and musicians of the original Richthofen band founded the band Seelenwalzer referencing the name of Richthofens first album. The debut album Totgeglaubt – German for "believed dead" – is being published with Massacre Records in May 2019.

Charts 

In 2003, Die Apokalyptischen Reiter's Have a Nice Trip was the first album produced by Andy Classen to enter the charts, reaching number 95 in Germany.

Since 2007, Legion of the Damned from the Netherlands have been able to chart regularly with Andy Classen-produced albums in Germany. Sons of the Jackal reached number 54 and in the following year, 2008, they even charted twice, reaching number 70 with Feel The Blade (and number 64 in Austria) and number 60 with Cult of the Dead.

Austrians Belphegor also charted in 2008 (with Bondage Goat Zombie) and 2009 (with Walpurgis Rites – Hexenwahn), reaching number 99 and 81 in Germany and even number 42 and 60 in Austria.

Credits

References

External links 
 Stage-One-Studio – Andy Classen's official studio website
 official myspace – with sample songs from Andy's own new project 'Nine XI'
 Seelenwalzer – official website of the Seelenwalzer band
 

German male musicians
German audio engineers
Living people
German record producers
Year of birth missing (living people)